The 2019 NCAA Division I Men's Golf Championship was the 81st annual tournament to determine the national champions of NCAA Division I men's golf. It was contested from May 24 to 29 at the Blessings Golf Club in Fayetteville, Arkansas and hosted by the University of Arkansas.

Stanford won its 9th team title with at 3–2 win over Texas in the finals. Matthew Wolff of Oklahoma State won the individual title by five strokes.

Qualifying
The five teams with the lowest team scores qualified from each of the six regional tournaments for both the team and individual national championships.
The lowest scoring individual not affiliated with one of the qualified teams in their regional also qualified for the individual national championship.

Regional tournaments

Team competition

Leaderboard
After 54 holes, the field of 30 teams was cut to the top 15.

SMU defeated Clemson in a sudden-death playoff to advance to match play.

Remaining teams: Arizona State (901), South Carolina (902), Georgia Tech (903), North Carolina (904), Liberty (906), UNLV (906), LSU (907), North Florida (907), Georgia (911), Duke (912), Georgia Southern (913), Baylor (915), Illinois (915), Louisville (932), BYU (938).

Match play bracket
The eight teams with the lowest total scores advanced to the match play bracket.

Source:

Individual competition
The field was cut after 54 holes to the top 15 teams and the top nine individuals not on a top 15 team. These 84 players competed for the individual championship.

References

NCAA Men's Golf Championship
Golf in Arkansas
NCAA Division I Men's Golf Championship
NCAA Division I Men's Golf Championship
NCAA Division I Men's Golf Championship
NCAA Division I Men's Golf Championship